Two ships of the Royal Navy have been named HMS Crispin:
  was an Ocean boarding vessel requisitioned in 1940 and lost in 1941
  was a  destroyer ordered as Craccher and launched in 1945. She was sold to Pakistan in 1956 and renamed Jahangir.

References

Royal Navy ship names